is a Japanese family descended from Emperor Seiwa (850–880) and the Minamoto clan (Seiwa-Genji). They were a cadet branch of the Ogasawara clan and the Takeda clan.

At the beginning of the 14th century AD, Ogasawara Nagafusa settled in Shikoku. His descendant in the 8th generation settled in the district of Miyoshi (Awa province) and took the name of the place. They were great vassals of the Hosokawa clan then all powerful in Shikoku.

During the Sengoku, they controlled several provinces, including Settsu (present-day Kinki region) and Awa. Though they would fade from prominence, the Ogasawara, a clan closely related to them, would continue as a major political force throughout the Edo period.

Among the retainers to the clan were Matsunaga Danjo Hisahide and his son Hisamichi from the Matsunaga clan during the Sengoku period.

Roots
The family name of the clan is Genji (Minamoto Clan). It belonged to one of the lineages of Seiwa Genji (Minamoto Clan), the Shinano Genji (Minamoto Clan) that falls into the branch family of Kawachi Genji (Minamoto Clan), and it was a branch family of the Ogasawara clan. The Miyoshi clan is a branch of the distinguished Ogasawara clan in Shinano Genji. But it is considered that the clan used a deceptive name as there are many contradictions in each existing genealogy. The clan is also called the Awa Ogasawara clan. The clan moved from Shinano Province into Miyoshi County, Awa Province, where it set its home ground.

Emergence
In the late Kamakura period, the clan name was in use in the Awa Province. It was a descendant of the Ogasawara clan, which was Awa Shugo. In the early period of the Northern and Southern Courts (Japan), the Miyoshi clan acted on the Southern Court (Japan), and there was a period when it conflicted with the Hosokawa clan on the Northern Court (Japan). However, with the Southern Court losing ground and the Hosokawa clan growing its influence in the bakufu (the Northern Court), the Miyoshi clan surrendered to the bakufu.

Decreasing power in mid course
In the Muromachi period, Yukinaga Miyoshi, dubbed a great commander having both wisdom and courage, appeared and served the Hosokawa clan as Shogunal Deputy. In the case of the succession dispute in the Hosokawa clan, Nagayuki supported Sumimoto Hosokawa, who was a child of Awa Shugo of the Hosokawa clan and later adopted by kanrei Masamoto Hosokawa. Nagayuki moved from place to place to fight and achieved military exploits gaining influence in the Kinki region and Shikoku. But he died a sad death, and so did Sumimoto Hosokawa.

After the death of Yukinaga, Motonaga, the grandson of Yukinaga, supported the young lord Harumoto Hosokawa. Motonaga made achievements by helping Harumoto become kanrei, and he ended up being the influential power in the Hosokawa clan. Viewing Motonaga's power as a threat, Harumoto accepted the slander from Masanaga and others who belonged to the Motonaga clan and were envious of Nagamasa Kizawa and Motonaga's rise. In 1532, with the help of the Ikko sect that hated Motonaga Miyoshi, who was a patron of the Hokke sect Harumoto, attacked Motonaga in Kenpon-Ji Temple in Sakai and forced Motonaga to kill himself. Due to the feud, the Miyoshi clan declined temporarily.

The golden age
Nagayoshi was braver and more resourceful than his father. At first, Nagayoshi served Harumoto as his loyal vassal. However, he married a daughter of Naganori Yusa, who was the shugodai of Kawachi Province and had a strong influence in the Kinki region. His influence extended not only to Awa Province but also to Settsu Province. In cooperation with his brothers Yoshikata Miyoshi (Awa), Kazumasa Sogo (Sanuki), and Fuyuyasu Atagi, he beat the forces of Nagamasa Kizawa in the battle of Taihei-Ji Temple and Nagamasa MIYOSHI one after another, both of whom had been his father's enemy. In the end, Nagayoshi established his power which was more powerful than his father's in the Hosokawa clan.

In 1549, Nagayoshi started to take revenge for his father's death. With the reinforcement from his father-in-law Naganori, he supported Ujitsuna Hosokawa, the child of Takakuni Hosokawa. Nagayoshi defeated Nagamasa Miyoshi, who had been a loyal vassal of Harumoto, and backed his power on the military side in Enami, Settsu Province (the Battle of Eguchi). Being afraid of Nagayoshi's power, Harumoto ran away to Otsu, and the Harumoto administration collapsed. As a result, Nagayoshi became famous as a daimyo in the Sengoku period. Furthermore, Nagayoshi fought with the shogun Yoshiteru Ashikaga and drove him away into Omi Province. And he grew to be a daidaimyo (daimyo having a greater stipend) to govern, in total, nine provinces Kinki region (Settsu, Kawachi, Yamato, Tanba Province, Yamashiro Province, Izumi Province) and Shikoku (Awa, Sanuki Province, Awaji Province), including part of Harima, Iyo, and Tosa.

And as he went up to Kyoto and declared his supreme power over Japan, he was called the first tenkabito and tried to establish the Miyoshi administration. Facing strong resistance from the old power, Nagayoshi stopped fighting with Yoshiteru, the shogun. He supported Yoshiteru and moved into the system to govern by Yoshiteru - Ujitsuna - Nagayoshi in order. Nagayoshi held real power while Yoshiteru and Ujitsuna were mere puppets. This period was the golden age of the Miyoshi clan.

Prosperity and decline
Nagayoshi was a man of elegance and taste who loved renga (linked verse), favored Zen, and enjoyed reading classics such as The Tale of Genji. He showed a tolerant attitude toward Christians and allowed various religions such as Buddhism (all sects), Shinto, and Christianity. Due to his attitude, confrontation among Buddhists (between the Hokke sect and Ikko sect) calmed down. And he posted his capable brothers in various places to administer his extended power. He restored Kyoto, which had been destroyed by the battles since Onin War. He acted energetically and made achievements including developing the town of Sakai City as a large trading port.

However, the resistance from the old power did not stop, and Takamasa Hatakeyama, one of sankanrei (three families in the post of kanrei, or shogunal deputy), and Yoshikata Rokkaku, the hankoku shugo (military governor in charge of the half area of the province) and male cousin of Harumoto raised a rebellion against the Miyoshi. With the struggle with them, Nagayoshi lost his brother Yoshikata in the battle of Kumeda (present Kishiwada City). He survived with his younger brothers (Kazumasa Sogo, Fuyuyasu Atagi), and he died at the age of 41. After the death of Nagayoshi, the adopted child Yoshitsugu, who was from the Miyoshi clan, succeeded. But as he was so young, Hisahide Matsunaga, the Karo (chief retainer), and Miyoshi sanninshu (three chief retainers of the Miyoshi clan) took the actual power, and Yoshitsugu was just their puppet. With the successive deaths of Nagayoshi and his younger brothers and as the result of Hisahide and sanninshu bickering over the leadership, the Miyoshi clan declined in strength.

The way to the fall
The clan supported the 14th shogun Yoshihide Ashikaga from the home ground of Awa. But in 1568, when Nobunaga Oda entered the capital Kyoto under the 15th shogun Yoshiaki Ashikaga, the Miyoshi clan did not have the strength to hold out against Oda. The Miyoshi clan challenged Oda to a decisive battle but lost, and some of the Miyoshi fled to their home ground in Awa while others became vassals of Nobunaga.

Later, when the shogun Yoshiaki conflicted with Nobunaga and the anti-Nobunaga network was laid, Yoshitsugu and Miyoshi clan Sanninshu took Yoshiaki's side and confronted Nobunaga. However, they did not have the strength to hold out against Oda's more powerful military. In 1573, while he was under attack by Nobumori Sakuma, one of Nobunaga's vassals, Yoshitsugu, killed himself. The head family of the Miyoshi clan died out.

In Awa Province in Shikoku, Nagaharu Miyoshi succeeded Yoshikata Miyoshi, and his real brother Masayasu Sogo still exerted their influence in the eastern part of Shikoku. However, after Nagaharu killed his loyal vassal Nagafusa Shinohara, believing the slanders, the vassals of Nagaharu became anxious and defected from the Miyoshi clan. Later Nagaharu was killed by his vassal acquainted with Motochika Chosokabe in Tosa Province. It is not an exaggeration to say that the Miyoshi clan as a Sengoku daimyo died out of this incident.

Later
Yasunaga Miyoshi, a survivor of the Miyoshi clan, became Nobunaga's vassal and was given territory in the part of Kawachi. Masayasu Sogo served Hideyoshi Toyotomi and gained territory in Sanuki Province. Yasunaga, the former, was unaccounted for after Honnoji Incident, and Masayasu, the latter, died in the battle of Hetsu-gawa and was forfeited his rank of samurai and properties.

In 1615, Masahide Sogo, the child of Masayasu, and Masayasu Miyoshi, the only survivor among Miyoshi sanninshu, died in the Sieges of Osaka. The Miyoshi clan's resurgence halted. Masakatsu Miyoshi survived by serving the Tokugawa clan while others served other daimyos.

Yoshikane Miyoshi and Yoshishige Miyoshi, who were the eldest legitimate son and second sons, respectively of Yoshitsugu Miyoshi, who belonged to the main bloodline of the Miyoshi clan, fled to Ibuki Island in Sanuki Province and both settled there. During the period of the rule by the Ikoma clan, Yoshikiyo Miyoshi, the grandson of Yoshikane was given the endorsement of the Administrative Board from the Ikoma clan and changed his family name to Sakuemon. At Ibuki-Hachiman-jinja Shrine on Ibuki Island, there still exists an ema (votive horse tablet) depicting the scene of Yoshikane and his vassals with reduced 80 horses by gunshots getting to Ibuki Island and offering the seimon (covenant) to the shrine.

In popular culture
In the 2020 Taiga drama, Kirin ga Kuru, Miyoshi Nagayoshi is played by Kazuhiro Yamaji, Miyoshi Yoshitsugu by Hiroyasu Kurobe, Miyoshi Nagayasu by Shōgo Miyahara, Iwanari Tomomichi by Hiroki Takano and Miyoshi Sōi by Kenji Oka.

Notable clan members
 Miyoshi Nagayoshi
 Miyoshi Yoshikata
 Sogō Kazumasa
 Sogō Masayasu
 Atagi Fuyuyasu
 Atagi Nobuyasu
 Miyoshi Yoshitsugu
 Iwanari Tomomichi
 Miyoshi Masanaga

Miyoshi clan's prominent castles
 Akutagawayama Castle
 Iimoriyama Castle
 Shōzui Castle
 Kishiwada Castle
 Shigisan Castle
 Takiyama Castle
 Shōryūji Castle

References

Japanese Wikipedia
Miyoshi family tree and information 

 
Japanese clans